Kevin O'Neill may refer to:

Sports
 Kevin O'Neill (basketball) (born 1957), American basketball coach
 Kevin O'Neill (cricketer) (1919–2014), Australian cricketer
 Kevin O'Neill (Australian footballer) (1908–1985), Australian football player
 Kevin O'Neill (soccer) (born 1925), Australian soccer player
 Kevin O'Neill (rugby union) (born 1982), New Zealand rugby union player
 Kevin O'Neill (Gaelic footballer), former Kildare footballer
 Kevin O'Neill (American football) (born 1975), American football linebacker

Others
 Kevin O'Neill (comics) (1953–2022), English comic book illustrator
 Kevin O'Neil (mobster) (born 1948), American former bar owner and mobster